Samuel Harding Hairston (January 20, 1920 – October 31, 1997) was a Negro league baseball and Major League Baseball player. He played for the Birmingham Black Barons and the Indianapolis Clowns of the Negro leagues and played part of one season with the Chicago White Sox as a catcher. He is buried in Birmingham's Elmwood Cemetery.

Family
Hairston comes from the biggest major league baseball family, as the father of MLB players Jerry Hairston, Sr. and Johnny Hairston, and the grandfather of  Jerry Hairston Jr. and Scott Hairston. A son, Sammy Hairston Jr., and three grandsons, Johnny Hairston Jr., Jeff Hairston and Jason Hairston played in the minor leagues. The five Hairstons who have played in the majors are tied for the most ever with the Delahanty brothers. The two of the three other three-generation MLB families have four members each: the Boone family (Ray, Bob, Bret and Aaron) and the Bell family (Gus, Buddy, David, and Mike). The Colemans are the other three generation MLB family (Joe, Joe, and Casey).

See also

Third-generation Major League Baseball families

External links
 and Seamheads

1920 births
1997 deaths
African-American baseball players
Baseball players from Birmingham, Alabama
Birmingham Black Barons players
Charleston ChaSox players
Charleston Senators players
Charleston White Sox players
Chicago White Sox players
Chicago White Sox scouts
Colorado Springs Sky Sox (WL) players
Indianapolis Clowns players
Indianapolis Indians players
Major League Baseball catchers
People from Crawford, Mississippi
Rapiños de Occidente players
Sabios de Vargas players
Sacramento Solons players
San Antonio Missions players
Burials at Elmwood Cemetery (Birmingham, Alabama)
20th-century African-American sportspeople